Lago Colico Airport  is a rural airstrip at the west end of Colico Lake in the Araucanía Region of Chile. The nearest town is Cunco,  to the north.

East approach and departure are over the water.

See also

Transport in Chile
List of airports in Chile

References

External links
OpenStreetMap - Lago Colico
OurAirports - Lago Colico
FallingRain - Lago Colico Airport

Airports in La Araucanía Region